Warren Shaun Groeneveld (born 21 August 1983) is a South African cricketer who currently plays for Boland. He is a left-handed batsman and left-arm orthodox spin bowler. Groeneveld made his first-class debut on 8 November 2007 against KwaZulu-Natal.

References
Warren Groeneveld profile at CricketArchive

1983 births
Living people
Cricketers from Paarl
South African cricketers
Boland cricketers